Stamatis Kourkoulos-Arditis (born 7 June 1998) is a Greek chess player who received the titles of International Master (IM) in 2018 and FIDE Master in 2014. He is ranked 13th best player in Greece and his highest rating was 2524 (in November 2021).

He won the 2019 Greek Championship.

In 2020, he won the 13th Paleochora Open with a score of 7.5/9

He beat GM Maxim Lagarde in round 9 of the European Championship, achieving the final score of 6/11.

References

External links
 
 

1998 births
Living people
Greek chess players
Chess International Masters
21st-century Greek people